Junior Yearly Meeting (JYM) is a gathering for young Quakers. There are various JYM groups worldwide, which cover the same geographical boundaries as their respective Yearly meeting. Most countries have one Yearly meeting which corresponds to national borders, but in the United States there are Yearly Meetings on regional, state and city level, and this is reflected in their JYMs. The frequency and age range of gatherings varies between JYMs.

In Britain, JYM is a residential annual gathering, held at a different time to the Britain Yearly Meeting all-age gathering, of about 140 16- to 18-year-olds from around the country and a few Friends from European Yearly Meetings. Each Monthly meeting within Britain Yearly Meeting nominates two young people to attend as representatives, and each of the Friends Schools in Britain (but not Northern Ireland) Quaker School also nominates two young people as representatives. The event is organised, clerked and facilitated by 16- to 18-year-olds in partnership with staff and adult volunteers (Over 20s).  Participants reflect on the theme through a variety of activities, including main speaker sessions, base groups and small group sessions. There are also a wide range of topical workshops.

In the United States, JYM gatherings take place either alongside the annual Yearly Meeting gathering, as a separate annual gathering, as in Britain, or as more frequent gatherings.

Baltimore Yearly Meeting, also has a JYM that composed of Young Friends (YF), who are 14–18, and Junior Young Friends (JYF) who are 11–13. BYM YFs are self-governed, choosing two clerks annually, and they conduct conferences throughout the year in addition to meeting at the BYM Annual Session. JYFs are not self-governing, but still conduct business meetings and hold conferences throughout the year. Most conferences are themed, and all include adult volunteers whose responsibilities usually consist of ensuring the YFs and JYFs safety rather than directing them. 

Quaker yearly meetings
Youth conferences